Barla Catrina Deplazes (born 14 November 1995) is a retired Swiss football forward, who played for FC Zürich of Switzerland's Nationalliga A. Since her debut in March 2015, a 4–1 defeat by Brazil, she has been a member of the Switzerland national team.

References

External links
 Profile at FC Zürich 

1995 births
Living people
Swiss women's footballers
Footballers from Zürich
Switzerland women's international footballers
2015 FIFA Women's World Cup players
Swiss Women's Super League players
FC Zürich Frauen players
Women's association football forwards